Azas can refer to:

 Azas, Haute-Garonne, France
 Todzha Lake, also known as Azas Lake, Russia
 Azas Plateau, Russia